The Woodmanston Site, located southwest of Riceboro, Georgia off Barrington Road, is a historic site which was listed on the National Register of Historic Places in 1973.

The site is gated, but visitors may enter the site by appointment.

Woodmanston was the plantation house of the Le Conte Plantation or Woodmanston Plantation, a rice plantation started by John Eaton LeConte, Sr.  The plantation was developed in Bull Town Swamp, a "typical backwater and cypress swamp" which is a tributary to the South Newport River which in turn opens into Sapelo Sound.  The site of the house was on a knoll above the tidal area and was, in 1972, still identifiable by the presence of a "few remaining hardwoods, flowering bushes and two palms."  A botanical garden on the property, developed by his son Louis, became internationally known.

References

Houses on the National Register of Historic Places in Georgia (U.S. state)
Houses completed in 1810
National Register of Historic Places in Liberty County, Georgia
Plantations in Georgia (U.S. state)